Giuseppe Natoli Gongora di Scaliti (9 June 1815 – 25 September 1867) was an Italian lawyer and politician from the Mediterranean island of Sicily. He was Minister of Agriculture under Camillo Benso, Count of Cavour, in the first government of the Kingdom of Italy after unification in 1861.

Life 

Natoli was born in Messina, in Sicily, on 9 June 1815, the son of Giacomo Natoli and Emanuela Cianciolo. He studied oratory and philosophy at the Accademia Carolina of Messina, and then studied law at the University of Palermo, where he graduated at the age of 22. From 1843 he taught at the University of Messina. He was offered a post as a judge, but declined it, not wishing to serve the Bourbon king. Natoli took part in the Sicilian Revolution of 1848, and as a result fled Sicily for Turin, where he spent eleven years in exile. In 1860 he was involved in organising Garibaldi's venture against Sicily, and embarked with the second wave of ships. Under the dictatorship of Garibaldi he was briefly minister for agriculture, and acting minister for foreign affairs.

After the unification of Italy in 1861, Camillo Benso, Count of Cavour, invited him to become minister for agriculture in the short-lived first government of the new Kingdom of Italy. Natoli was made a Senator of Italy and appointed prefetto ("governor") of Brescia, but was dismissed after troops opened fire on a crowd on 16 May 1862. He was then prefetto of Siena for about two weeks.

In 1864 Alfonso La Marmora made Natoli minister for education in his government. In 1865, following the resignation Giovanni Lanza, he was also interim minister for home affairs for a few months.

Natoli died on 25 September 1867 in the cholera epidemic in Messina. He was buried in the chapel of the Arciconfraternita degli Azzurri.

Natoli was a Grand Officer of the Order of Saints Maurice and Lazarus, and an officer of the Order of San Marino.

References 

1815 births
1867 deaths
Politicians from Messina
Barons of Italy
Historical Right politicians
Italian Ministers of the Interior
Deputies of Legislature VIII of the Kingdom of Italy
Members of the Senate of the Kingdom of Italy
Jurists from Sicily
Italian people of the Italian unification
University of Palermo alumni
Academic staff of the University of Messina
Grand Officers of the Order of Saints Maurice and Lazarus
Deaths from cholera
Infectious disease deaths in Sicily